Lamoria oenochroa is a species of snout moth in the genus Lamoria. It was described by Turner in 1905. It is found in Australia, including Queensland.

References

Moths described in 1905
Tirathabini